Akeem Vargas (born 29 April 1990) is a German professional basketball player for USC Heidelberg of the Basketball Bundesliga. Before he joined Frankfurt, he played for Alba Berlin. Vargas was born in the United States but grew up in Leimen (Baden), Germany.

During the 2019-20 season, Vargas averaged 7 points and 2.8 rebounds per game in BBL play with Skyliners Frankfurt. He signed with BG Göttingen on July 23, 2020.

On June 23, 2022, Vargas signed with MLP Academics Heidelberg of the Basketball Bundesliga.

Vargas is a former member of the German national basketball team.

References

External links
Eurocup Profile
German BBL Profile
Eurobasket.com Profile

1990 births
Living people
Alba Berlin players
Basketball players from California
BG Göttingen players
Ehingen Urspring players
German men's basketball players
Iowa Lakes Lakers men's basketball players
People from Lancaster, California
People from Leimen (Baden)
Sportspeople from Karlsruhe (region)
Shooting guards
Skyliners Frankfurt players
Sportspeople from Los Angeles County, California
Tigers Tübingen players
USC Heidelberg players